Kaika Saning'o Telele (born 15 January 1954) is a Tanzanian CCM politician and Member of Parliament for Ngorongoro constituency since 2005.

References

1954 births
Living people
Chama Cha Mapinduzi MPs
Deputy government ministers of Tanzania
Tanzanian MPs 2005–2010
Tanzanian MPs 2010–2015
Centre for Foreign Relations alumni